The 1986–87 Saudi Premier League season reverted to a regular home and away league format instead of the previous season's group phases.

Al Ettifaq would win the title for the second time.

Newly promoted sides Al-Ansar and Al-Raed would be relegated at the first time of asking proving in the process that it is hard for promoted teams to survive in the first season as few teams have managed to achieve this feat.

Al-Raed were the second side, after Al Taawon to represent Buraydah in the top flight.

Stadia and locations

League table

Promoted: Al Kawkab, Al Ohod.
Full records are not known at this time

External links 
 RSSSF Stats
 Saudi Arabia Football Federation
 Saudi League Statistics

Saudi Premier League seasons
Professional League
Saudi Professional League